Vladykino is the name of several rural localities in Russia:
Vladykino, Moscow Oblast, a village under the administrative jurisdiction of the Town of Klin in Klinsky District of Moscow Oblast; 
Vladykino, Novgorod Oblast, a village in Opechenskoye Settlement of Borovichsky District in Novgorod Oblast
Vladykino, Issinsky District, Penza Oblast, a selo in Znamensko-Pestrovsky Selsoviet of Issinsky District in Penza Oblast
Vladykino, Kamensky District, Penza Oblast, a selo in Vladykinsky Selsoviet of Kamensky District in Penza Oblast
Vladykino, Pushkinogorsky District, Pskov Oblast, a village in Pushkinogorsky District of Pskov Oblast
Vladykino, Velikoluksky District, Pskov Oblast, a village in Velikoluksky District of Pskov Oblast
Vladykino, Kalininsky District, Saratov Oblast, a selo in Kalininsky District of Saratov Oblast
Vladykino, Rtishchevsky District, Saratov Oblast, a selo in Rtishchevsky District of Saratov Oblast
Vladykino, Vologda Oblast, a village in Chushevitsky Selsoviet of Verkhovazhsky District in Vologda Oblast